Stargate games are inspired by the Stargate franchise, which started with the 1994 film, Stargate directed by Roland Emmerich.

The games in this article are not related to the 1981 arcade game Stargate by Williams Electronics.

Games

Stargate ride 
Stargate SG-3000 (abbreviated to SG-3000) is a simulator thrill ride based around the highly successful MGM television series Stargate SG-1 that made its debut at The Space Centre in Bremen, Germany in December, 2003. A reproduction has now been built at Kentucky Kingdom, Six Flags Discovery Kingdom and Six Flags Great America. As of 2006, Six Flags Great America no longer shows Stargate SG-3000. The contract with the park expired and the movie was pulled about a month before the season started.

Stargate pinball 

Stargate is a 1995 pinball game, designed by Ray Tanzer and Jon Norris and released by Gottlieb. The game is based on the film Stargate, not the television show Stargate SG-1. It has many modes, including several multi-ball modes.

A "pyramid" is the main feature of this game. It has a top that opens by raising and lowering. A moving "Glidercraft" ship will be extended from the pyramid when the pyramid is open. The "Glidercraft" will zigzag left-right, in front of the pyramid, with about 90 degrees of horizontal movement.

This game also features two "Horus" targets. These are basically the reverse of drop targets: they are targets that, rather than dropping down into the playfield when hit, rise up into the air. Each target is attached to a large "Horus" structure, which is itself attached to a pivot that can raise and lower. These Horus structures drop to block the player from reaching two key shots. The game occasionally raises them, allowing the player to temporarily make the shots. Part of the development involved having actor James Spader record the voice parts of Daniel Jackson.

Stargate Trading Card Game 
Stargate Trading Card Game (abbreviated as Stargate TCG) is a trading card game based on the long-running Stargate series. It released in both online and physical card formats in April 2007. The three sets released were based on Stargate SG-1. The Stargate TCG is designed by Sony Online Entertainment and published by Comic Images.

The TCG pulls players into the Stargate universe as they put their favorite characters together to form a team and send them through the gate to accomplish missions. New gameplay lets characters "learn" from their accomplishments and mistakes to increase their capabilities. There are three different ways to possibly win: Earning experience points, collecting glyphs, or scoring Adversaries. By completing missions, players can play glyphs onto their characters which unlock abilities that could help them win the game.

The online version of the game has since been discontinued. It was identical to the standard game and contained the same cards. However, being online it gave players the advantage of a more diverse group of opponents to play against at any time of day or night. Also, it included an online deck builder and collection management system, making it easy to manage physical and virtual collections. There were also online tournaments with rewards of free cards and increased player rankings in worldwide standings. There was at one point a redemption program known as "Through the Gate". This allowed players to collect the full set of digital cards, and then redeem them online for physical cards. The online game went live on April 27, 2007.

The first set of cards contains 292 cards. Starter decks feature Jack O'Neill, Daniel Jackson, Samantha Carter, and Teal'c, and are fully playable, each containing sixty cards including four team character cards that are based on the heroes of the show. Booster packs each contain eleven additional cards, including characters, enemies, missions, weapons and other gear, as well as obstacles that players can use to enhance their deck. The set is made up of 66 Rare cards, 66 Uncommon cards, 100 Common cards, 6 Ultra-Rare cards, and 54 Starter-deck-only cards.

Released on August 16, 2007, the second set contains 292 cards and is based on the Goa'uld System Lords. Set two focuses on expanding the villain aspect of Stargate TCG. Starter Decks feature Ba'al, Apophis, Osiris, and Yu. It introduced a new feature called Dominion and expanded upon existing traits from the Stargate SG-1 set such as Russians, Tok'ra, and NID. The set is made up of 66 Rare cards, 66 Uncommon cards, 100 Common cards, 6 Ultra-Rare cards, and 54 Starter-deck-only cards.

Released on May 9, 2008, the third entitled Rise of the Ori, includes 240 cards and it introduces Ships, Promotion Tokens, and the Blockade ability.

A fourth set was announced and was going to be based on the spin-off television show, Stargate Atlantis. However, The game was discontinued before the fourth set was ever released.

Stargate SG-1 roleplaying games

Stargate SG-1 Adventure Game (1998) 
The Stargate SG-1 Adventure Game was a role-playing game based on the Canadian-American television series Stargate SG-1. In 1998, West End Games obtained a license to develop derivative works from the television show. They hired John Scott Tynes to develop the property for them using WEG's D6 System. WEG ran into financial difficulties and the Stargate SG-1 Adventure Game project was cancelled, after Tynes had completed about two-thirds of the game. Tynes was refused payment for his work, and he subsequently made the incomplete game available for download from his website.

Stargate SG-1 Roleplaying Game (2003) 
The Stargate SG-1 Roleplaying Game is a role-playing game based on the Canadian-American television series Stargate SG-1, released in 2003 by Alderac Entertainment Group. The game, based on AEG's Spycraft, uses the d20 System. It was considered canon by the publishers and the staff of MGM. When Sony purchased MGM, MGM lost the license to produce Stargate game products and the development license is unassigned.

Stargate SG-1 Roleplaying Game (2021) 
The Stargate SG-1 Roleplaying Game is a role-playing game based on the Canadian-American television series Stargate SG-1. It was developed by Wyvern Gaming through a collaboration with MGM, and was originally set to be released in 2020, but was later postponed to a 2021 release date, starting with a Kickstarter in October 2020. The game is based on the Dungeons & Dragons 5th edition Open Game License.

Video games

Stargate (1994, handheld) 
The first Stargate video game film tie-in was a Tetris-like puzzle game released for the Nintendo Game Boy in 1994 and the Sega Game Gear in 1995. It was developed by Probe Entertainment and published by Acclaim Entertainment.

Stargate (1994, console) 

Simply titled Stargate, this movie tie-in was an action game where the player controlled Jack O'Neil. This game was developed by Probe Entertainment and published by Acclaim Entertainment for Super Nintendo Entertainment System and Mega Drive in 1994.

Stargate SG-1: The Alliance 

Stargate SG-1: The Alliance, (abbreviated as SG-1:TA), is a cancelled game based on Stargate SG-1. Development was cancelled in August 2005.

The game was said to have been based upon the events of the SG-1 seasons; the player was able to select their character for a mission and fulfill the roles of that character as seen in the TV show. It was confirmed that the Alliance part of the name referred to the Alliance between Anubis and the new enemy, Haaken. The Haaken have never appeared in the TV show, they are a new alien race that was created by the developer's concept artists and game designers. The game was an FPS with an option for a third person perspective, consisting of objectives to be reached during various missions and levels. Since the developers have not shown much of the gameplay, it is not clear how exactly the game was meant to play out. However, from the video from the Stargate Atlantis: Rising DVD, it appears to follow the storyline well. In 2012, gaming blog Past to Present Online began to release information about the game, including gameplay videos that revealed the storyline and mechanics.

According to IGN, an "administrator posting in the game's official forum stated that the game has been cancelled". However, this has never been officially confirmed by the developer, Perception Studios, despite laying off the majority of its staff in January 2006.

After a two-year-long legal battle with JoWood Productions, Perception won their fight in December 2007 with JoWood admitting they had no rights to the Stargate franchise. In fact, Perception has all rights to the Stargate SG-1: The Alliance game, and any further Stargate game releases. It was expected that work would now continue in some way on The Alliance, although existing parts of the already made game may not be used. Peter DeLuise was especially disappointed, having devoted much time to the game's development (albeit primarily the audio portion).

Stargate Worlds 

Stargate Worlds (abbreviated as SGW) was to be a massively multiplayer online role-playing game (MMORPG) video game in-development by Cheyenne Mountain Entertainment (CME) (in association with Metro-Goldwyn-Mayer) (MGM) and was to be published by FireSky for Microsoft Windows. The game's setting was mainly borrowed from military science fiction series Stargate SG-1. It was announced that Cheyenne Mountain Entertainment is under evaluation by a receiver and that development of Stargate Worlds has ceased.

Stargate: Resistance 

Stargate: Resistance (abbreviated as SGR) is an online, third-person shooter owned and operated by Dark Comet Games, powered by the Unreal 3 engine, and based on the television series Stargate SG-1. It was announced in December 2009 and originally released in 2010 by Firesky and Cheyenne Mountain Entertainment, however Cheyenne Mountain Entertainment has been in receivership since March 2010. Since then, Firesky entered into an agreement with Dark Comet Games for the maintenance, operation and development of Stargate Resistance. The game has sold over 51,000 copies and new downloadable content was being released.  No subscription fee was required to play the game. At midnight (PST), January 17, 2011, all Stargate Resistance servers were shut down, including an extensive user forum.

In December 2014, fans of the game were able to bring up new unofficial game servers, allowing users to play the game as it was just before the January 2011 shut down.

Stargate SG-1: Unleashed 
On February 6, 2013, a trailer for Stargate SG-1: Unleashed was posted on IGN. The game is an adventure game featuring the original SG-1 team for Android and iOS, and was developed by MGM and Arkalis Interactive. 
The story begins when the Goa'uld Sekhmet is inadvertently released from the canopic jar and starts to plot a revenge against the Earth. After Jack O'Neill from the alternate timeline appears at the SGC, the original team is sent to discover and counter the sinister plot by Sekhmet.
The first episode was released on March 14, 2013. The second was released November 7, 2013 on iOS only.

Stargate: Timekeepers
Stargate: Timekeepers will be a real-time tactics video game, it has been announced on May 11, 2021.

This game is developed by CreativeForge Games and published by Slitherine Software UK Ltd.

According to the publisher, it will be similar to Desperados III or Shadow Tactics and the release date is scheduled for 2022.

On December 14th 2021, the gameplay of the first two missions was revealed during the Home of Wargamers Live+ Winter Edition event. Beta test is scheduled for spring 2022 and final release for summer 2022.

On May 10th 2022, the gameplay of the third mission was revealed during the Home of Wargamers 2022 event. Beta test is finally scheduled around the 25th anniversary of Stargate SG-1 on July 27th 2022.

Fangame

Stargate Network

Stargate Network was an unofficial simulation video game. Work on the game first began in 2007, with 3 French fans creating a 2D Flash game which was released in 2008. The team subsequently expanded, creating a new 3D version in Unreal Engine 3 which was released in 2012. The project then switched to Unreal Engine 4, with the new 4.0 version released in December 2017. In V4, players were able to explore Stargate Command, the Pyramid of Abydos as well as pilot a Puddle Jumper spacecraft.

Over its lifetime, the game was shown off at various conventions with a number of actors from both Stargate SG-1 and Stargate Atlantis playing, including David Hewlett, Christopher Judge, David Nykl and Cliff Simon who portray Rodney McKay, Teal'c, Radek Zelenka and Ba'al respectively. Upon meeting SG-1 and Atlantis VFX supervisor Bruce Woloshyn at Gatecon 2018, the team were shown original blueprints and drawings from the television shows to help with their work.

After the announcement of Stargate: Timekeepers, an official game being developed by Slitherine Ltd., MGM issued Stargate Network with a cease and desist, leading to the game being taken offline. The development team, along with their legal representation were subsequently able to begin a dialog with MGM and set about renegotiating turning the game into a licensed product. The team subsequently continued development, setting up a studio called Icy Skip. After Amazon acquired MGM in 2022, the development team found themselves unable to contact MGM and subsequently decided to cease development. In December 2022, the development team released a statement detailing their efforts to continue making the game and revealed footage from the new version they had been developing in Unreal Engine 5, showcasing their in-game recreation of the Battle of Antarctica from "Lost City", and demonstrating their unfinished map of Atlantis and planet generation system.

Carter's Addon Pack 
The Stargate Carter Pack,  also known as Carter's Addon Pack or CAP, is a fan-created add-on for Garry's Mod that added various Stargate mechanics to the Garry's Mod game. Development for it was officially discontinued in 2015.

References

External links
Stargate SG-1 Adventure Game – John Tynes' unfinished work for West End Games
 Stargate: Timekeepers

Stargate
Video games based on films
Role-playing games based on television series